Surinam Airways, also known by its initials SLM, is the flag carrier of Suriname, based in Paramaribo. It operates regional and long-haul scheduled passenger services. Its hub is at Johan Adolf Pengel International Airport (Zanderij). Surinam Airways is wholly owned by the Government of Suriname.

History 
The airline was established in 1953 by private entrepreneurs Rudi Kappel and Herman van Eyck as the Kappel-Van Eyck Aviation Company, aimed at operating feeder flights from a domestic network. Scheduled operations started with two Cessna 170B in January 1955 with domestic flights between Paramaribo and Moengo.

On 30 August 1962, the company was purchased from Herman van Eyck by the Surinamese government and renamed Surinam Airways or in Dutch SLMSurinaamse Luchtvaart Maatschappij. The logo of Surinam Airways depicts a  'Sabaku', which is a Surinamese word for cattle egret.

From 1964 Surinam Airways started scheduled international operations to Curaçao together with ALM Antillean Airlines.

At , the carrier had 400 employees. At this time, the fleet consisted of a Douglas DC-8-63, a Douglas DC-8-50CF (registration: PH-DCW, named 'Sabaku') and three Twin Otters (PZ-TCD, PZ-TCE & PZ-TCF). It operated international routes to Amsterdam, Belem, Curacao, Georgetown, Manaus, Miami and Panama City, and domestic services to Apoera, Avanavero, Bakhuys, Djoemoe, Ladouanie, Moengo and Nieuw Nickerie.

From 1955 until 2005 Surinam Airways operated an extensive domestic network.

In 1983 the regional routes were flown with a Boeing 737-200 (registration OY-APR) leased from Maersk Air (named 'Tjon Tjon'). The transatlantic route was flown with DC-8's leased from Arrow Air, DC-8-62 registered N1806 and also DC-8-63, registered N4935C, named 'Stanvaste'''. From May 1993 until April 1999 a DHC-8-300 Dash 8 (registration: N106AV) was used on the regional routes.

On 7 June 1989, a Douglas DC-8-62 (registration: N1809E, first named 'Fajalobi, later re-christened into 'Anthony Nesty') crashed on approach to Zanderij Airport, killing 175 occupants on board.

From January 1996 until December 1999 Surinam Airways used a MD-87 (PZ-TCG, named 'District of Para') and thereafter a DC-9-51 (PZ-TCK, named 'District of Wanica') and an MD-82 (PZ-TCL, named 'City of Paramaribo') on the regional routes.

, the airline had 543 employees.

From August 2004 until the end of 2009 Surinam Airways operated a Boeing 747-300 (PZ-TCM, named 'Ronald Elwin Kappel'), which was purchased from KLM. It was replaced with a 317-seater Airbus A340-300 (PZ-TCP, named 'Palulu''') and later another younger A340-300 (registration: PZ-TCR).

In early 2009, Surinam Airways ordered two Boeing 737-300s (PZ-TCN, named 'District of Commewijne and PZ-TCO, named 'District of Marrowijne') to replace its McDonnell Douglas MD-82s.

A Boeing 737-700 (PZ-TCS, named 'District of Saramacca') was leased from DAE Capital and arrived on 30 April 2018 in Suriname and became operational in May 2018, this plane was formerly flown by Air China. In December 2018 a second Boeing 737-700 (PZ-TCT, named District of Brokopondo') arrived, formerly flown by Aeromexico and leased from Air Castle.

From December 2019 a B777-200 was leased from Boeing Capital to replace the Airbus A340-300 previously used on the Paramaribo – Amsterdam route. The aircraft was registered PZ-TCU, named 'Bird of the Green Paradise with a special livery and performed its first commercial ETOPS flight in December 2020. Due to the COVID-19 pandemic and possible high maintenance costs the B777 was returned in March 2021. It was parked for a while in Victorville. Now Boeing is using this aircraft as its new ecoDemonstrator.

Corporate affairs 
At one time the company had its head office at Mr. Jagernath Lachmonstraat 136. , Surinam Airways was the owner of both the only terminal in Zanderij Airport and the only ground handling company in that airport.

Senior management 

On 16 April 2021, the Surinamese Government, during the SLM General Meeting of shareholders, appointed Dutchman Paul de Haan as the new Chief Executive Officer (CEO) of Surinam Airways (SLM). In January 2022 Xaviera Jessurun was appointed by the Government as chairman of the board of the SLM.
On 9 April 2022, Frenchman Yves Guibert was appointed as the new senior vice president operations.
In July 2022 the management of Surinam Airways announced the company would dry lease a Boeing 737-800 for its regional routes in order to reduce its Monthly expenditure. The financially troubled Surinamese airline will use government owned gold company's Grassalco's gold stock as cover for financing facility converted into a term deposit for the SLM recovery plan. "The recovery plan is based on a formulated business plan, in which the revenues for the coming period are projected, based on the planned operations. With a thorough implementation of the recovery plan, it is assumed that no claim will have to be made to the coverage provided," the senior management of the company reports on 25 July 2022.

List of former managing directors (presidents) and CEOs 

 R.E. Kappel (1953–1955)
 H. van Eijck (1955–1958)
 N. Zaal (1960–1962)
 K.C. de Miranda (1962–1965)
 G. Veira (1965–1970)
 B.Th. Maes (1970–1979)
 ir. L.C. Johanns (1979–1980)
 ir. E. Marhé (1980–1981, acting director)
 Mr. M. Mungra (1981–1989)
 D.E. Deira (1989–1991, acting director)
 R.H. Calor (1991–1994)
 R. Lachmising (1994–2005)
 H. Jessurun (2005–2010)
 E. Henshuijs (2011 – January 2016)
 L. Voigt (January 2016 – July 2016)
 R. Lachmising (July 2016 – February 2018)
 G. Lau (juli 2018 – July 2019)
 R. Radjkoemar (September 2019 – October 2020)
 J. Sandie (November 2020 – March 2021, acting director)
 P. de Haan (March 2021 – current)

Destinations 

Surinam Airways operates scheduled services to the following destinations, . Terminated destinations are also listed.

Codeshare agreements
 TUI fly Netherlands

Fleet

Current
, the Surinam Airways fleet consists of the following aircraft:

The airline also has one A320-200 and one Airbus A330-200 on wet-lease.

Retired 
Surinam Airways operated the following aircraft throughout its history:

 Airbus A340-300
 Beech G-18S
 Bell 47G Helicopter
 Boeing 707-320C
 Boeing 737-200
 Boeing 737-300
 Boeing 737-700
 Boeing 747-200B
 Boeing 747-300SCD
 Boeing 777-200ER
 Cessna UC-78C Bobcat
 Cessna 170B
 Cessna 206
 de Havilland Canada DHC6-100 Twin Otter
 de Havilland Canada DHC6-300 Twin Otter
 DHC-8-300
 Douglas C-47A
 Douglas C-47B
 Douglas DC-6A
 Douglas DC-6B
 Douglas DC-8 Series 50
 Douglas DC-8 Super 60 Series (-62 and -63 models)
 McDonnell Douglas DC-9-50
 McDonnell Douglas MD-80
 Piper PA-18 Super Cub
 Piper PA-23-160 Apache E

Accidents and incidents
 On 5 May 1978, a Douglas DC-6 from the Surinaamse Luchtvaart Maatschappij, registered N3493F was damaged beyond repair while landing at Paramaribo-Zanderij International Airport on a cargo flight from Curaçao Hato International Airport. All 3 occupants survived.
Out of 187 occupants on board, only 11 people survived the accident, which remains the worst in Suriname's history.

See also 
 List of airlines of Suriname
 Transport in Suriname

References

External links 

 Official Website
 Official Website 

 
Airlines of Suriname
Government-owned airlines
Airlines established in 1953
Paramaribo
Latin American and Caribbean Air Transport Association
Companies of Suriname